Princess Marie Anne of Saxe-Altenburg (14 March 1864 – 3 May 1918) was the consort of Georg, Prince of Schaumburg-Lippe. As the eldest daughter of Prince Moritz of Saxe-Altenburg and his wife Princess Augusta of Saxe-Meiningen, and a sister of Ernest II, Duke of Saxe-Altenburg, Marie Anne was a member of the Ducal House of Saxe-Altenburg.

Marriage and issue
On 16 April 1882 at Altenburg, Marie Anne married Georg, Hereditary Prince of Schaumburg-Lippe. He was the eldest son of Adolf I, Prince of Schaumburg-Lippe, and succeeded as Prince of Schaumburg-Lippe in 1893.

The couple had nine children together:

Prince Adolf II (1883–1936); married Ellen von Bischoff-Korthaus
Prince Moritz Georg (1884–1920)
Prince Peter (1886-1886)
Prince Wolrad (1887–1962); married Princess Bathildis of Schaumburg-Lippe, a distant cousin
Prince Stephan (1891–1965); married Duchess Ingeborg of Oldenburg, daughter of Frederick Augustus II, Grand Duke of Oldenburg
Prince Heinrich (1894–1952); married Countess Marie-Erika von Hardenberg
Princess Margaretha (1896–1897)
Prince Friedrich Christian (1906–1983); married Countess Alexandra Hedwig Johanna Bertha Marie zu Castell-Rüdenhausen
Princess Elisabeth (1908–1933); married Baron Johann Herring von Frankensdorff

Silver wedding anniversary
On the occasion of their silver wedding anniversary in 1907, Emperor Wilhelm II presented to Georg and Marie Anne the family ancestral seat, Castle Schaumburg. The castle had been controlled by the Hohenzollerns ever since Georg's grandfather sided with the Austrians in the 1866 Austro-Prussian War. The gift was also meant to be in recognition of Georg's support in the dispute over the succession to the Lippe-Detmold throne.

Prince George died on 29 April 1911. Princess Marie Anne died seven years later, on 3 May 1918 at age 54.

See also
 List of consorts of Lippe

Ancestry

References

1864 births
1918 deaths
House of Saxe-Altenburg
Princesses of Saxe-Altenburg
House of Lippe
Princesses of Schaumburg-Lippe